Leonard William Stephan (25 July 1935 – 2 September 2012) was an Australian politician. He was a National Party member of the Legislative Assembly of Queensland from 1979 to 2001, representing the electorate of Gympie.

Early life
Born in Brisbane, Stephan was a farmer, Shire of Widgee councillor and Gympie Agricultural Society president before entering politics.

Politics
Stephan was elected to the safe National seat of Gympie at the 1979 Gympie by-election. He served as Deputy Government Whip from 1987–89, and Government Whip from September to December 1989. He briefly served in the shadow ministry under Russell Cooper and Rob Borbidge in the early 1990s, serving as Opposition Spokesman on Regional Development and Forestry from 1990–91, and Opposition Spokesman on Forestry and Administrative Services from 1991–92, but had returned to the backbench by the National Party's 1995 election victory.

Stephan won his closest re-election in many years in 1998 against a One Nation candidate; he retired at the 2001 state election, at which the National Party lost Gympie to One Nation's Elisa Roberts.

References

1935 births
2012 deaths
National Party of Australia members of the Parliament of Queensland
People from Brisbane
Members of the Queensland Legislative Assembly
21st-century Australian politicians